Clive Hachilensa (born 17 September 1979 in Mazabuka) is a Zambian football (soccer) defender. He comes from the southern part of Zambia and has a sister and two other brothers.

He was part of the Zambian 2006 African Nations Cup team, who finished third in group C in the first round of competition, thus failing to secure qualification for the quarter-finals.
Hachilensa is currently playing for ZESCO United F.C. In 2007, he played for IFK Mariehamn in Finnish premier division, Veikkausliiga. He made his debut on "The Islanders" on 4 August 2007 against FC KooTeePee. He scored a goal on his debut to secure his team a 3 – 2 win, and was a popular player among the fans. He was also part of the squad who played the 2008 African cup of nations in Ghana and their team were sent out in group stages. He joined South African side Carara Kicks F.C. in 2008 and is currently at the club.

Clubs
2001–2003:  Kabwe Warriors
2004:  Green Buffaloes
2005:  ZESCO United
2005–2007:  Free State Stars
2007: /  IFK Mariehamn
2008:  ZESCO United
2008–:  Carara Kicks F.C.

External links

1979 births
Living people
People from Mazabuka District
Zambian footballers
Zambia international footballers
Zambian expatriate footballers
2006 Africa Cup of Nations players
2008 Africa Cup of Nations players
Green Buffaloes F.C. players
Kabwe Warriors F.C. players
Free State Stars F.C. players
Zambian expatriate sportspeople in South Africa
Expatriate soccer players in South Africa
Expatriate footballers in Finland
IFK Mariehamn players
Veikkausliiga players
Zambian expatriate sportspeople in Finland
ZESCO United F.C. players
Association football defenders
Carara Kicks F.C. players